George Alonzo Coe (August 16, 1811 – October 21, 1869) was an American politician from the U.S. state of Michigan. He served as the 11th lieutenant governor of Michigan.

Early life
Coe was born in Rush, New York and moved to Illinois at a young age. He was raised on his father's farm until the age of fourteen and then attended school and taught school. He studied law with Judge Pratt in Rochester, New York and began the practice of law in Coldwater, Michigan in 1839. In 1856, Coe became a law partner with future Congressman Charles Upson.

Political career
Coe held various political positions in Michigan, and was elected as a Whig candidate to the Michigan House of Representatives in 1840. In 1846 he was elected to the Michigan Senate to represent the 4th District, and in 1847 he was elected to the State Senate to represent the 3rd District. Coe was elected as the first Republican to serve as the 11th Lieutenant Governor of Michigan. He served as Lieutenant Governor from 1855 to 1859 under Michigan Governor Kinsley Bingham.

Coe was also a delegate to the 1856 Republican National Convention from Michigan, which nominated John C. Fremont for U. S. President, however Fremont lost to James Buchanan in the general election. Coe left office in 1859 at the age of fifty-eight, and resumed his legal practice.

He died in Coldwater, Michigan on October 21, 1869, ten years after leaving office. He is interred in Oak Grove Cemetery in Coldwater.

References

Further reading

External links
 Michigan's Former Lt. Governors

	

1811 births
1869 deaths
Lieutenant Governors of Michigan
Michigan state senators
Members of the Michigan House of Representatives
People from Rush, New York
Michigan Whigs
Burials in Michigan
19th-century American politicians
Michigan Republicans
People from Coldwater, Michigan